Native Forest Action Council was an environmental organisation in New Zealand.

It was formed in 1975 from what was the Beech Forest Action Committee to advocate for the protection of native forests and changed its name to the Maruia Society in 1988.  The Maruia Society then became the Ecologic Foundation with Guy Salmon as its director.

External links
Ecologic Foundation - Official web site
Native Forest Action web site

Environmental organisations based in New Zealand